The 1995 Asian Super Cup was the 1st Asian Super Cup, a football match played between the winners of the previous season's Asian Club Championship and Asian Cup Winners Cup competitions. The 1995 competition was contested by Thai Farmers Bank of Thailand, who won the 1994–95 Asian Club Championship, and Yokohama Flügels of Japan, the winners of the 1994–95 Asian Cup Winners' Cup.

Route to the Super Cup

Thai Farmers Bank 

1Farmers Bank goals always recorded first. 
2 The AFC ordered that 2nd leg was to be played in Malaysia due to a plague threat in India, but Mohun Bagan objected to the ruling; they were ejected from the competition, fined $3000 and banned from AFC competitions for three years.

Yokohama Flügels 

1Yokohama' goals always recorded first.

Game summary 

|}

First leg

Second leg

References
Asian Super Cup 1995 (AFC)
Asian Super Cup 1995 (RSSSF)

Asian Super Cup
Super
1995
1995
Asia
Asian Super Cup
Asian Super Cup
Asian Super Cup
Thai Farmers Bank matches
Yokohama Flügels matches